Gießgraben may refer to:
 Gießgraben (Danube), a river of Lower Austria, tributary of the Danube
 Gießgraben (Schutter), a river of Bavaria, Germany, tributary of the Schutter
 Gießgraben (Zusam), a river of Bavaria, Germany, tributary of the Zusam